Izumisano is a city located in Osaka Prefecture, Japan. , the city had an estimated population of 98,840 in 47658 households and a population density of 1700 persons per km².

Geography
Izumisano is located approximately halfway between Osaka City and Wakayama City, bordered by Osaka Bay to the northwest and the Izumi Mountains and Kongō-Ikoma-Kisen Quasi-National Park to the south. The northern third of Kansai International Airport is located within the city limits on  an artificial island offshore, and the area within Izumisano includes the connecting bridge to the mainland.

Neighboring municipalities
Osaka Prefecture
Sennan
Kaizuka
Tajiri
Kumatori
Wakayama Prefecture
Kinokawa

Climate
Izumisano has a Humid subtropical climate (Köppen Cfa) characterized by warm summers and cool winters with light to no snowfall.  The average annual temperature in Izumisano is 15.1 °C. The average annual rainfall is 1488 mm with September as the wettest month. The temperatures are highest on average in August, at around 25.6 °C, and lowest in January, at around 4.4 °C.

Demographics
Per Japanese census data, the population of Izumisano has increased steadily from the year 1920 to the year 1980, and has leveled off since..

History
The area of the modern city of Izumisano was within ancient Izumi Province. The area also had many Kofun period burial mounds from the 5th to 7th century AD. From the Kamakura to the Muromachi period a large portion of the area was controlled by Hine-no-shō, a large landed estate owned by the Kujō family of Court nobility. In the Edo Period, much of the city area was controlled by Kishiwada Domain with smaller portions controlled directly by the Tokugawa shogunate.

After the Meiji restoration, the village of Sano established within Hine District with the creation of the modern municipalities system on April 1, 1889. On  April 1, 1896 the area became part of Sennan District, Osaka. Sano was elevated to town status on October 1, 1911. Sano annexed the village of Kitanakado on April 1, 1937. On April 1, 1948 Sano was promoted to city status. To avoid confusion with Sano, Tochigi, the city name was chosen to be Izumisano.On April 1, 1954, the city expanded to its present area by annexing the neighboring villages of Minaminakadori, Nagataki, Kaminogo, Hineno and Otsuchi. Kansai International Airport was opened on April 4, 1994, with Rinku Town commercial development opening in 1995.  Izumisano entered into discussions to merge with  Sennan, Misaki, Hannan and Tajiri to form the city of "Sennanshu" (南泉州市) from 2001 to 2004; however, per a public referendum, only Misaki was in favor of the merger and the plans were abandoned.

Government
Izumisano has a mayor-council form of government with a directly elected mayor and a unicameral city council of 18 members. Izumisano collectively with the cities of Kaizuka, Sennan, and the smaller municipalities of Sen'nan DIstrict contributes two members to the Osaka Prefectural Assembly. In terms of national politics, the city is part of Osaka 19th district of the lower house of the Diet of Japan.

Economy
The main industries of Izumisano remain food-related: agriculture, commercial fishing and food processing. The main crops are onions, eggplants, cabbage, and broccoli. Textile production is also important, with the city accounting for 47% of domestic towel production. Due to the proximity of Kansai International Airport, airport-support and aviation-related industries have increase. Peach Aviation has its head office in Izumisano. The city is also home to the 256-m (840-ft) Rinku Gate Tower Building, the third tallest building in Japan.

Education
Izumisano has 13 public elementary schools and five public middle schools operated by the city government and three public high schools operated by the Osaka Prefectural Department of Education. The Rinku campus of the Osaka Prefecture University is also located at Izumisano.

Transportation

Airport 
 Kansai International Airport

Railway
 JR West – Hanwa Line
 - <> -  -  
 JR West – Kansai Airport Line
 -  
 Nankai Electric Railway -   Nankai Main Line
  -  -  - 
 Nankai Electric Railway -   Nankai Airport Line
  -

Highway
 Hanshin Expressway
  Hanwa Expressway
  Kansai-Kūkō Expressway

Sister and Friendship Cities 
 Xuhui District and Baoshan District, Shanghai, China
 Töv Province, Mongolia
 Xindu District, Chengdu, China
 Gulu, Uganda
 Marília, São Paulo, Brazil

Local attractions
Hine-no-shō sites, National Historic Site
 Jigen-in temple
 Hine Jinja
 Site of the Battle of Kashii

Notable people from Izumisano
 Yumi Asō, actress
 Hineno Hironari, samurai
 Fumitaka Kitatani, football player
 Kenshiro Matsunami, politician of the Liberal Democratic Party
 Ryotaro Meshino, football player
 Takumi Minamino, football player
 Takashi Nagayasu, politician of the Democratic Party of Japan
 Baikei Uehira, master calligrapher

Gallery

References

External links

 Izumisano City official website 
 Izumisano City Living Guide（英語版） 
 Izumisano City Sightseeing 

Cities in Osaka Prefecture
Populated coastal places in Japan
Izumisano